The Clean Cities Coalition Network is a coordinated group of nearly 100 coalitions in the United States working in communities across the country to advance affordable, domestic transportation fuels, energy efficient mobility systems, and other fuel-saving technologies and practices. The U.S. Department of Energy’s Office of Energy Efficiency and Renewable Energy’s Vehicle Technologies Office facilitates national coordination of the coalitions through its Technology Integration Program. The Network consists of 79 coalitions that work with more than 15,000 local stakeholders that have helped shift nearly 10 billion gasoline gallon equivalents of conventional fuel to alternative fuels or energy efficiency improvements, put more than 1.1 million alternative fuel vehicles on the road, and contributed to the expansion of alternative fueling station infrastructure since 1993. As of early 2020, there were more than 29,000 fueling stations nationwide that provide at least one of the following alternative fuels: ethanol (E85), biodiesel, compressed natural gas, electric, hydrogen, liquefied natural gas, renewable natural gas, or propane.

Indiana 
The State of Indiana contains two designated Clean Cities coalitions: Greater Indiana Clean Cities and South Shore Clean Cities. Greater Indiana Clean Cities serves the following Indiana counties: Adams, Allen, Bartholomew, Blackford, Boone, Brown, Carroll, Cass, Clark, Clay, Clinton, Crawford, Daviess, Dearborn, Decatur, Delaware, Dubois, Fayette, Floyd, Fountain, Franklin, Gibson, Grant, Greene, Hamilton, Hancock, Harrison, Hendricks, Henry, Howard, Huntington, Jackson, Jay, Jefferson, Jennings, Johnson, Knox, Lawrence, Madison, Marion, Martin, Miami, Monroe, Montgomery, Morgan, Ohio, Orange, Owen, Parke, Perry, Pike, Posey, Putnam, Randolph, Ripley, Rush, Scott, Shelby, Spencer, Sullivan, Switzerland, Tippecanoe, Tipton, Union, Vanderburgh, Vermillion, Vigo, Wabash, Warren, Warrick, Washington, Wayne, Wells, White. 

Greater Indiana is a Clean City Coalition focused on advancing communities with education and resources on alternative fuel vehicles. Their mission is to advance alternative, domestic fueled transportation including energy efficient technologies across all sectors in Indiana. The standalone nonprofit 501(c)3 organization serves public and private sector members. Designated as a Clean Cities Coalition by the U.S. Department of Energy in August of 1999, Greater Indiana is a resource for members integrating alternative fuels, technologies, and efficiency measures. Greater Indiana hosts educational and networking events fostering opportunities for partnerships between fleets and industry providers. By facilitating these partnerships and projects, Greater Indiana is fostering the economic, environmental, and energy security of the United States.

Greater Indiana News:

Indiana Soybean Alliance and Indiana Corn Marketing Council find a successful relationship in Greater Indiana

Greater Indiana Clean Cities Meets With Congress

Greater Indiana Clean Cities Names Clean Fleet Award Winners

South Shore Clean Cities serves northern Indiana: the eighteen counties, Benton, DeKalb, Elkhart, Fulton, Jasper, Kosciusko, LaGrange, Lake, LaPorte, Marshall, Newton, Noble, Porter, Pulaski, St. Joseph, Starke, Steuben and Whitley.

Chartered on June 15, 1999, South Shore Clean Cities is a government/industry partnership designed to help reduce petroleum consumption in the transportation sector. Located in an area that has suffered the devastating environmental impact of the industrial practices of the late-nineteenth through the mid- twentieth centuries, South Shore Clean Cities is dedicated to preserving and revitalizing Northern Indiana by promoting the use of clean fuels and clean vehicles technology.

September 6, 2011 - Environmentalist touts Yellowstone's eco success story

September 20, 2011- South Shore Clean Cities award electric vehicles to northern Indiana cities.

October 16, 2011 - All charged up, but nowhere to plug

December 16, 2011 - Tube City IMS Brings Lean and Green Locomotive to northwest Indiana

Maryland 
The Washington Metropolitan Area Transportation Authority. Better known as simply "Metro," the authority provides transit services to the metropolitan area in and around Washington, D.C. The authority has a fleet of 1,500 buses, including 74 hybrid electric buses and Metro plans to have nearly 500 more hybrid-electric buses by 2012. Vice  Maryland Governor Martin O'Malley, who last year committed to convert the entire Maryland Transit Administration bus fleet to hybrid-electric buses by 2014. Maryland has already accelerated its purchase of hybrid-electric buses with the help of Recovery Act funds (Clean Cities).

Tennessee Clean Fuels 
The state of Tennessee has two designated Clean Cities coalitions: the East Tennessee Clean Fuels Coalition and the Middle-West Tennessee Clean Fuels Coalition. They sometimes operate under the shared name "Tennessee Clean Fuels". Both were designated in 2004, and collectively serve the entire state. 

Many fleets in Tennessee use alternative fuels like the Great Smoky Mountains National Park; cities like Knoxville, Nashville, Sevierville and Kingsport; Oak Ridge National Laboratory; utilities and airports; mass transit agencies; and large international companies like UPS and Waste Management. As of early 2020, Tennessee has about 70 public E-85 stations, 13 large public CNG stations, 19 public propane sites, and over 390 EV charging locations.

The East Tennessee coalition - ETCleanFuels - has started numerous projects and initiatives over the years. Here are a few examples:
 The Fuels Fix is website and monthly email service that is "Clean Cities stories and alternative fuel news." Each month, other Clean Cities coalitions from around the country provide articles and then those articles are sent to email subscribers.
 The I-75 Green Corridor Project was a project that ETCleanFuels led from 2009-2015 that installed 40 biofuel pumps along I-75 to build it into "the longest biofuels corridor on the planet." Both ethanol E-85 and biodiesel B-20 pumps were installed during the project.
 Tennessee Green Fleets is a fleet certification program that offers fleets or any type that are reducing their petroleum use and increasingly using alternative fuels and reducing greenhouse gas emissions a way to get recognized for their efforts. Fleets have to meet criteria and submit data to get certified.
 Drive Electric Tennessee, or DriveElectricTN, is a statewide program that is a collaboration of many partners in Tennessee including Tennessee Valley Authority, the TDEC Office of Energy Programs, and many other stakeholders. The partnership has developed an "EV Roadmap" for the state and as of 2020 is building out working groups that will tackle issues like awareness, infrastructure, policies and programs, and innovation to help drive electric vehicle (EV) adoption across the state.

Wisconsin 
The state of Wisconsin has one Clean City coalition designated in 1994 called Wisconsin Clean Cities. Serving the entire state of Wisconsin, WCC has provided education and outreach regarding alternative fuels, vehicles, infrastructure, fuel efficiency improvements and idle reduction. WCC has been instrumental in securing federal and state funding to implement many projects across the state of Wisconsin. Since 2010 WCC has participated in hundreds of events and public engagements statewide. In 2013, WCC reported a reduction of nearly  12 million in gasoline gallon equivalents due to the increase of alternative fuels and technologies. WCC also reported a greenhouse gas emission reduction at 57.9 tons in 2012, a 99% increase from the previous year.

Empire Clean Cities 
Empire Clean Cities is the Clean Cities coalition for New York City & the Lower Hudson Valley (Westchester, Rockland, & Putnam Counties).  ECC was incorporated in 2007 and was formerly known as New York City & Lower Hudson Valley Clean Cities.  ECC has been tasked with providing support and management skills necessary to advance the region's economic, environmental, and energy security by building local public-private partnerships towards promoting the use of technologies and practices that reduce petroleum consumption.  In 2012 ECC introduced Empire Green Fleets a metric used to evaluate the overall impact of public and private fleets operating in the region.  ECC also launched a Green Food Trucks initiative in 2012.  With the popularity of food trucks in NYC growing ECC conducted an investigation on the feasibility of promoting the use of biodiesel in these trucks.

American Recovery and Reinvestment Act 
On 2009 Earth Day, Vice President Joe Biden announced the availability of $300 million in funding from the American Recovery and Reinvestment Act for state and local governments and transit authorities to expand the nation's fleet of clean, sustainable vehicles and the fueling infrastructure necessary to support them. The Clean Cities Alternative Fuel and Advanced Technology Vehicles Pilot Program supported 25 cost-share projects involving alternative fuels or advanced vehicles in collaboration with 50 Clean Cities coalitions and 700 stakeholders who provided an additional $500 million in matching funds. Eligible technologies included a number of different light- and heavy-duty vehicles, including hybrid, plug-in hybrid electric, hydraulic hybrid, electric, fuel cell, and compressed natural gas vehicles. In addition, projects supported refueling infrastructure for alternative fuels, including biofuels and natural gas. Other efforts eligible for funds included public awareness campaigns and training programs on alternative fuel and advanced technology vehicles and infrastructure. The program required a 50% cost share from participants.

These projects established 1,380 alternative fueling stations and put more than 9,000 alternative fuel and advanced technology vehicles on the road while supporting U.S. energy independence and contributing to regional economic development. The Clean Cities Coalition Network compiled a report, Designing a Successful Transportation Project: Lessons Learned from the Clean Cities American Recovery and Reinvestment Act Projects, summarizing high-level project design and administrative considerations for conducting a successful transportation project.

The Southeast Propane Autogas Development Program is the largest Clean Cities alternative fuel vehicle conversion deployment program in history. The Program is administered by Virginia Clean Cities at James Madison University and the Virginia Department of Mines, Minerals and Energy. The Program is converting fleet vehicles from gasoline to autogas in the Southeastern United States. The project received an $8.6 million grant from the American Recovery and Reinvestment Act.

Criticism 
In 2009, the California Cars Initiative stated that the Clean Cities American Recovery and Reinvestment Act Project Awards included a scattering of funding for electrification and charging stations, but most of it was for carbon-based liquid fuels or non-pluggable hybrids. Clean Cities federal funding in 2010-2011 was set up with a majority of the funding favoring plug-in EVs and HEVs. However, the amount of funding and focus of that funding ebbs and flows between the alternative fuels over time due to advances in technology and interest in those fuels. CNG and propane were more popular in the early 2000s, the biofuels ethanol and biodiesel took center stage in the mid-2000s.

The U.S. Department of Energy has awarded nearly $460 million through its funding opportunities for hundreds of projects across the country to implement alternative fuels and energy-efficient vehicle technologies. These awards leveraged almost $1.2 billion more in matching funds and in-kind contributions from the private and public sector. These project awards contribute to advancing affordable, domestic transportation fuels and fuel-saving technologies and practices.

Funded projects have included:

 Understanding transportation electrification in public and private fleets.
 Integrating alternative fuel vehicles and refueling infrastructure in urban and rural communities.
 Implementing living lab projects that demonstrate and assess new mobility solutions that maximize the return on investment to mobility systems in terms of time, cost, energy, and opportunity.
 Developing fueling and charging stations along busy transportation corridors.
 Providing resiliency planning through diversified vehicle and fueling options.
 Securing real-world data on total cost of ownership for alternative fuels.

See also 
 EPA Sustainability
 Greenhouse gas emissions by the United States
 Nashville Auto Diesel College
 National Alternative Fuels Training Consortium
 Ohio Technical College
 Phase-out of fossil fuel vehicles
 Southeast Propane Autogas Development Program
 Tarrant County College
 Traviss Career Center
 York Technical College
 Zero-emission zone

References

External links 
 Energy Efficiency & Renewable Energy (EERE) News
 EERE News: Clean Cities

Climate change in the United States
Energy in the United States